Montaione is a comune (municipality) in the Metropolitan City of Florence in the Italian region Tuscany, located about  southwest of Florence.

History

The frazione of Filicaja was  the starting point of Antonio da Filicaja for the invasion of Pisa by the Florentine army in 1509.

Main sights
The church of San Regolo houses the Madonna del Buonconsiglio by Guido da Graziano (late 13th century)
Church and convent of San Vivaldo. The church has works attributed to Giovanni della Robbia, Benedetto Buglioni, Raffaellino del Garbo and Andrea Sansovino
Castles include those of:
Iano
Camporena, destroyed by the Florentines in 1329.
Vignale
Collegalli, now a patrician villa
Figline, known from the 12th century. It is owned by the Filicaja family.
Pozzolo, known from the 11th century. It contains murals by Giuseppe Bezzuoli and Augustus Wallis. 
Barbialla, owned in the Middle Aged by the Cadolingians and the della Gherardesca families, then by the bishops of Volterra, the commune of San Miniato, the Republic of Florence and the Republic of Pisa.
Castelfafi, allegedly founded by the Lombards in the 8th century. It was a possession of the della Gherardesca and then of the bishops of Volterra. Later it was acquired by the Caetani. In 1554 it was sacked by the troops of Piero Strozzi.
Tonda
Sughera
Scopeto
Santo Stefano

Nature

The  Italian Horse Protection Association (IHP) has its main base in Montaione's frazione of Filicaja.

References

External links

 Official website
 www.montaione.net

Cities and towns in Tuscany
Castles in Italy